Biała  (1943–1945 German Billheim) is a village in the administrative district of Gmina Zgierz, within Zgierz County, Łódź Voivodeship, in central Poland.

A Roman era (Przeworsk culture) cemetery was excavated near the village.

References

Villages in Zgierz County